Xixi National Wetland Park is a national wetland park in China, located at the west part of Hangzhou, Zhejiang province, and has a total size of . The park is densely crisscrossed with six main watercourses, among which are scattered various ponds, lakes and swamps.

XiXi Wetland has a history of more than 4000 years and an abundant cultural heritage. It's the original site of Chinese South Opera; it has a traditional dragon boat contest; it contains the vivid life of a water village, featuring silkworm feeding and silk production.

History 
Xixi Wetland Park has a six staged history from Liangzhu Culture to the Republic of China.

Liangzhu Culture 
During the Liangzhu Culture period, Xixi Wetland has its starting shape. The area and the number of lakes were much greater than now. The area of Laohe Mountain was also included in Xixi Wetland.

Han and Tang dynasties 
During the Han and Tang dynasties, human activities started to appear around Xixi Wetland. People named their village as "Tang Village". In Five Dynasty, there were garrisons set around Xixi Wetland.

Song and Yuan dynasties 
During Song and Yuan dynasties, Xixi Wetland had a huge development. In Southern Song dynasty, the emperor Gaozong Song adored Xixi Wetland and wanted to set it as the capital place. There was a royal river road for Gaozong Song in Xixi Wetland. Xixi Wetland started to become an important transportation river and a military area.

Ming and Qing dynasties 
This is the most flourishing period of Xixi Wetland. The local government started to regulate floods, so the lands in Xixi Wetland became visible. Citizens fed silkworms on lands, and faster fish in the river. The beauty of the land and rivers attracted many literati to write poems and paint. Therefore, the education grew in this period.

Republic of China and People's Republic of China 
In 2002, Xixi Wetland was assigned to Hangzhou and to Xihu District. Many villagers lived here. With the growth of industrialization, factories also moved in, and cause contamination in Xixi Wetland. In August 2003, the protection project of Xixi Wetland started to preserve the wildlife and sights in Xixi Wetland, and it became the first national wetland park in China.

The sights

Wildlife
Xixi Wetland is honored as "The Green Lung in the Paradise". There are 221 species, 182 genera, and 85 families of vascular plants, 7 phytoplankton, and 6 vegetation types. There are 2802 old persimmon trees. The bird resources in the wetland are also extremely rich, with 89 species, 12 orders, 26 families, accounting for nearly 50% of all birds in Hangzhou.

Typical birds are: little egret, wild geese, common kingfisher, mallard duck and silver pheasant.

Aquatic animals are carp, chub, shrimp, eel and crab.

Some of the vegetation includes: persimmon, willow, camphor, bamboo, mulberry, plum, peach, elm, nelumbo, maple, poplar and hibiscus.

Cultural contribution

Literature

Hong Zhong is a famous judge in the Ming dynasty. He built a large courtyard that consists of messuages, parks, and colleges called "Hong Zhong Bie Ye" in the Xixi wetland area. This massive aristocratic residence is one of the primary forms of Grand View Garden in one of the four classic novels of Chinese Literature "Hong Lou Meng." Therefore, Xixi Wetland had provided a cultural background for Chinese literature.

Village

Xixi Wetland also has a non-material cultural heritage. It preserves the old villages. "Xixi Cultivate Cultural village," "Wu Chang Cultural Village," "Xixi Art Village," and "Xixi citizen Village" are the four villages that reserve the traditional Chinese culture and remind modern people how the culture has been developed from old times.

Festivals

There are five traditional festivals in Xixi Wetland Park.

 New Year Wintersweet Festival From the Song dynasty, wintersweet is one of the famous flowers in Xixi Wetland, and there are hundreds of poems praise the wintersweet in Xixi. In the Qing dynasty, the poet Gong Zi Zhen praised Xixi wintersweet as one of the three best wintersweet in South China. Therefore, from 2003, the government set the New Year Wintersweet Festival every February and invite people to enjoy the wintersweet.
 Xixi Hundred Flower Festival This festival has started in the Ming dynasty; the old government set the day as the birthday of all flowers. Now, the festival still preserves, and people built massive sculptures made by flowers to celebrate the flowers' birthday every April.
 Xixi Dragon Boat Festival Dragon Boat competition starts in the South Song dynasty to develop people's teamwork and the spirit of solidarity. Form 2008, the dragon boat festival starts in Xixi Wetland Park; people gather to compete and celebrate the Duan Wu Festival every June.
 Persimmons Festival From the Song dynasty, Xixi Wetland starts to plant persimmon trees. Until now, there are 15,000 persimmon trees, more than 4000 of them have lived for more a hundred of years. The emperor Qian Long in the Qing dynasty love eating persimmons in Xixi Wetland and set this festival. Therefore, every September, people pick persimmons and enjoy the beauty of Xixi Wetland.
 Reed Festival The reed in Xixi Wetland is one of the three most beautiful in Hangzhou. In fall, the reed sea in the river swing in the wind. When you taking a boat, the reed will be everywhere around you. The setting sun and reed make a beautiful scene. So, every November, people will take a boat and enjoy the beauty of reed in Xixi.

Throughout a year, the festivals express the beauty and treasure in Xixi Wetland.

References

Geography of Hangzhou
Wetlands of China
National parks of China
Tourist attractions in Hangzhou
Landforms of Zhejiang
Parks in Zhejiang